Cerconota ebenocista is a moth in the family Depressariidae. It was described by Edward Meyrick in 1928. It is found in French Guiana.

References

Moths described in 1928
Cerconota
Taxa named by Edward Meyrick